A SIM swap scam (also known as port-out scam, SIM splitting, Smishing and simjacking, SIM swapping) is a type of account takeover fraud that generally targets a weakness in two-factor authentication and two-step verification in which the second factor or step is a text message (SMS) or call placed to a mobile telephone.

Method 
The fraud exploits a mobile phone service provider's ability to seamlessly port a phone number to a device containing a different subscriber identity module (SIM). This mobile number portability feature is normally used when a phone is lost or stolen, or a customer is switching service to a new phone.

The scam begins with a fraudster gathering personal details about the victim, either by use of phishing emails, by buying them from organised criminals, or by directly socially engineering the victim.

Armed with these details, the fraudster contacts the victim's mobile telephone provider.  The fraudster uses social engineering techniques to convince the telephone company to port the victim's phone number to the fraudster's SIM. This is done, for example, by impersonating the victim using personal details to appear authentic and claiming that they have lost their phone. In some countries, notably India and Nigeria, the fraudster will have to convince the victim to approve the SIM swap by pressing 1.

In many cases, SIM numbers are changed directly by telecom company employees bribed by criminals.

Once this happens, the victim's phone will lose connection to the network, and the fraudster will receive all the SMS and voice calls intended for the victim. This allows the fraudster to intercept any one-time passwords sent via text or telephone calls sent to the victim and thus allows them to circumvent many two-factor authentication methods of accounts (be it their bank accounts, social media accounts, etc.) that rely on text messages or telephone calls. Since so many services allow password resets with only access to a recovery phone number, the scam allows criminals to gain access to almost any account tied to the hijacked number. This may allow them to directly transfer funds from a bank account, extort the rightful owner, or sell accounts on the black market for identity theft.

Incidents
A number of high-profile hacks have occurred utilizing SIM swapping, including some on the social media sites Instagram and Twitter. In 2019, former Twitter CEO Jack Dorsey's Twitter account was hacked via this method. 

In May 2020, a lawsuit was filed against an 18 year old Irvington High School senior in Irvington, New York, Ellis Pinsky, who was accused with 20 co-conspirators of swindling digital currency investor Michael Terpinthe founder and chief executive officer of Transform Groupof $23.8 million in 2018, when the accused was 15 years old, through the use of data stolen from smartphones by SIM swaps. The lawsuit was filed in federal court in White Plains, New York and asked for triple damages.

In early 2022, the US FBI reported a sharp increase in money losses to consumers in 2021, and continuing into 2022, from this type of fraud. The losses in 2021 alone were five times larger than the three prior years summed: “The FBI says that victims lost $68 million to this SIM-card based scam in 2021, compared to just $12 million in the three-year period between 2018 and 2020.” The FBI received 1,600 complaints about SIM-swapping in 2021, a sharp increase from the three previous years. The swaps happen quickly once the scammers have sufficient information to persuade a mobile phone carrier to assign a stolen phone number to their phone; the thefts of money happen when the thieves then receive the two-factor codes sent to the proper owner of the phone number.

References

Fraud in India
Confidence tricks